Wim Quist (27 October 1930 – 9 July 2022) was a Dutch architect.

Some works

References

1930 births
2022 deaths
20th-century Dutch architects